The meridian 66° west of Greenwich is a line of longitude that extends from the North Pole across the Arctic Ocean, North America, the Atlantic Ocean, the Caribbean Sea, South America, the Southern Ocean, and Antarctica to the South Pole.

The 66th meridian west forms a great circle with the 114th meridian east.

From Pole to Pole
Starting at the North Pole and heading south to the South Pole, the 66th meridian west passes through:

{| class="wikitable plainrowheaders"
! scope="col" width="120" | Co-ordinates
! scope="col" | Country, territory or sea
! scope="col" | Notes
|-
| style="background:#b0e0e6;" | 
! scope="row" style="background:#b0e0e6;" | Arctic Ocean
| style="background:#b0e0e6;" |
|-
| style="background:#b0e0e6;" | 
! scope="row" style="background:#b0e0e6;" | Lincoln Sea
| style="background:#b0e0e6;" |
|-
| 
! scope="row" | 
| Nunavut — Ellesmere Island
|-
| style="background:#b0e0e6;" | 
! scope="row" style="background:#b0e0e6;" | Nares Strait
| style="background:#b0e0e6;" |
|-
| 
! scope="row" | 
|Washington Land
|-
| style="background:#b0e0e6;" | 
! scope="row" style="background:#b0e0e6;" | Nares Strait
| style="background:#b0e0e6;" | Kane Basin
|-
| 
! scope="row" | 
|Inglefield Land
|-
| style="background:#b0e0e6;" | 
! scope="row" style="background:#b0e0e6;" | Baffin Bay
| style="background:#b0e0e6;" |
|-
| style="background:#b0e0e6;" | 
! scope="row" style="background:#b0e0e6;" | Davis Strait
| style="background:#b0e0e6;" |
|-
| 
! scope="row" | 
| Nunavut — Cumberland Peninsula, Baffin Island
|-
| style="background:#b0e0e6;" | 
! scope="row" style="background:#b0e0e6;" | Davis Strait
| style="background:#b0e0e6;" | Cumberland Sound
|-
| 
! scope="row" | 
| Nunavut — Hall Peninsula, Baffin Island
|-
| style="background:#b0e0e6;" | 
! scope="row" style="background:#b0e0e6;" | Frobisher Bay
| style="background:#b0e0e6;" |
|-
| 
! scope="row" | 
| Nunavut — Meta Incognita Peninsula, Baffin Island
|-
| style="background:#b0e0e6;" | 
! scope="row" style="background:#b0e0e6;" | Hudson Strait
| style="background:#b0e0e6;" |
|-
| style="background:#b0e0e6;" | 
! scope="row" style="background:#b0e0e6;" | Ungava Bay
| style="background:#b0e0e6;" |
|-valign="top"
| 
! scope="row" | 
| Quebec Newfoundland and Labrador — Labrador, from  Quebec — from 
|-
| style="background:#b0e0e6;" | 
! scope="row" style="background:#b0e0e6;" | Gulf of Saint Lawrence
| style="background:#b0e0e6;" |
|-
| 
! scope="row" | 
| Quebec — Gaspé Peninsula
|-
| style="background:#b0e0e6;" | 
! scope="row" style="background:#b0e0e6;" | Chaleur Bay
| style="background:#b0e0e6;" |
|-
| 
! scope="row" | 
| New Brunswick — passing just east of Saint John at 45°17'N
|-
| style="background:#b0e0e6;" | 
! scope="row" style="background:#b0e0e6;" | Bay of Fundy
| style="background:#b0e0e6;" |
|-
| 
! scope="row" | 
| Nova Scotia
|-
| style="background:#b0e0e6;" | 
! scope="row" style="background:#b0e0e6;" | Atlantic Ocean
| style="background:#b0e0e6;" |
|-
| 
! scope="row" | 
|
|-valign="top"
| style="background:#b0e0e6;" | 
! scope="row" style="background:#b0e0e6;" | Caribbean Sea
| style="background:#b0e0e6;" | Passing just east of the island of La Orchila,  (at )
|-
| 
! scope="row" | 
|
|-valign="top"
| 
! scope="row" | 
| Amazonas Rondônia — from 
|-
| 
! scope="row" | 
|
|-
| 
! scope="row" | 
|
|-
| style="background:#b0e0e6;" | 
! scope="row" style="background:#b0e0e6;" | Atlantic Ocean
| style="background:#b0e0e6;" | San Jorge Gulf
|-
| 
! scope="row" | 
|
|-
| style="background:#b0e0e6;" | 
! scope="row" style="background:#b0e0e6;" | Atlantic Ocean
| style="background:#b0e0e6;" |
|-
| 
! scope="row" | 
| Isla Grande de Tierra del Fuego
|-
| style="background:#b0e0e6;" | 
! scope="row" style="background:#b0e0e6;" | Atlantic Ocean
| style="background:#b0e0e6;" |
|-
| style="background:#b0e0e6;" | 
! scope="row" style="background:#b0e0e6;" | Southern Ocean
| style="background:#b0e0e6;" |
|-valign="top"
| 
! scope="row" | Antarctica
|-
| style="background:#b0e0e6;" | 
! scope="row" style="background:#b0e0e6;" | Southern Ocean
| style="background:#b0e0e6;" |
|-valign="top"
| 
! scope="row" | Antarctica
|-
|}

See also
65th meridian west
67th meridian west

w066 meridian west